The William Livingstone House (commonly called Slumpy) was a house constructed in 1894 and located in the Brush Park district of Detroit, Michigan.

William Livingstone Jr. (1844–1925), publisher of the Detroit Evening Journal, was the second president of the Dime Savings Bank. He hired a young Albert Kahn, who was working for the architectural firm of Mason & Rice, to design his residence on Eliot Street. When he obtained this commission – presumably with Mason's help – Kahn was only 22 or 23 years old and had just returned from spending 1891 in Europe, studying the classical architecture of the Old World: his decision to design the home in the French Renaissance Revival style reflected the time he spent sketching the best Gallic architecture.

In 1987, the Red Cross intended to demolish the mansion, originally located west of John R. Street, to make way for their new building. Preservationists succeeded in moving the Livingstone House about one block to the east, but the building languished for many years on its final resting place before partially collapsing and being demolished on September 15, 2007. The William Livingstone House was commemorated in a painting by Lowell Bioleau entitled Open House, which was unveiled the day of its demolition.

References

Houses in Detroit
Demolished buildings and structures in Detroit
Demolished buildings and structures in Michigan
Former houses in the United States
Houses completed in 1894
Buildings and structures demolished in 2007